Soběsuky is a municipality and village in Kroměříž District in the Zlín Region of the Czech Republic. It has about 400 inhabitants.

Administrative parts
Villages of Milovice and Skržice are administrative parts of Soběsuky.

References

Villages in Kroměříž District